Remada is a town in Tunisia, close to the border with Libya. Remada was built as a garrison town by the French and is today home to a Tunisian military base.

During the First World War, the French occupied the city and built houses for their soldiers.

Climate

Notes

References

External links 
 Lexicorient

Populated places in Tataouine Governorate
Communes of Tunisia